Pnictes asphyxiatus is a species of freshwater American sole known only from the Amazon Basin in Brazil. It is so far known from only one specimen. This species is the only known member of its genus, Pnictes.

References
 

Achiridae
Fish described in 1889
Taxa named by David Starr Jordan